Sahayatrika is an organization catering to lesbian/bisexual women and transgender persons of Kerala origin. The name is a Malayalam word meaning "Women fellow-travelers".

The organization mainly works on counselling, community-organizing and survival of women from gender and sexual minorities. It was started by Canadian immigrant Malayali Deepa Vasudevan. The organisation also collaborates on LGBT public awareness-building programs.

Sahayatrika was formed in the backdrop of rising lesbian suicide rates at a certain point in time in Kerala. Initial discussions on Sahayathrika happened in 2001. The first project, in association with a mental health organization, FIRM, was started in 2002. In 2008, Sahayatrika became an independent registered organization.

The organisation celebrated its 20th anniversary in 2022 by organising a grand function titled Idam, inaugurated by Minister of Higher Education and Social Justice, R. Bindu and attended by prominent personalities and activists including actress Shakeela.

References

External links
 Official Facebook page

LGBT organisations in India
Lesbian organizations
Organisations based in Kerala
2008 establishments in Kerala
Organizations established in 2008